The Latin American Motorcycle Association (otherwise known as LAMA) was founded in 1977 in Chicago, Illinois, U.S. LAMA is an international organization that is recognized as one of the most active long-distance riding clubs in the world.

History
Founded in 1977, LAMA operated as a single chapter in Chicago's Humboldt Park neighborhood for nearly 20-years. In 1995, the LAMA Miami chapter was founded, and one year later, LAMA grew to become a national association with election of the organization's first president. LAMA became an international association in 1999 with chapters in Puerto Rico, Mexico and Cuba. Now LAMA has chapters in Brazil, Uruguay, Argentina, Australia, Venezuela and Spain.

Patch

Membership
As of mid-2019, LAMA exceeded 10,000 riding members in 165 chapters worldwide.

Notes

References

External links

Motorcycle clubs
Hispanic and Latino American organizations
1977 establishments in Illinois
Clubs and societies in the United States